Sinoniscus is an extinct genus of prehistoric bony fish that lived during the Late Permian epoch.

See also

 Prehistoric fish
 List of prehistoric bony fish

References

Palaeonisciformes
Late Permian fish
Permian fish of Asia